Bąkowiec  is a village in the administrative district of Gmina Garbatka-Letnisko, within Kozienice County, Masovian Voivodeship, in east-central Poland. 

History
26 July 1945 - Division of AK (the commander Bernaciak Marian) released from transport, near Bąkowiec, about 120 prisoners, including many soldiers of underground armies. Among those freed were Lt. Col. Antoni Żurowski "Andrzej Bober" - the commander of VI Division Warszawa-Praga of Armia Krajowa and Lt. Col. Henryk Krajewski "Trzaska" - commander of 30 Poleski Infantry Division in Action  "Burza".

References

External links
 
 
 

Villages in Kozienice County